"Best I Ever Had" is a song recorded by Canadian singer and rapper Drake for his debut EP So Far Gone. It first became prominent from the release of mixtape of the same name. The song is also included on Drake's debut studio album Thank Me Later, as a bonus track on the Japanese version of the album, and on iTunes in several countries.

It was released as the third single from the album in the United Kingdom on October 11, 2010, as a double-A-side single with "Fancy". The song's popularity helped Drake decide to release So Far Gone as an EP, available for purchase. The song samples "Fallin' in Love" by Hamilton, Joe Frank & Reynolds and "Do It For The Boy" by Lil Wayne.

"Best I Ever Had" peaked at number two on the US Billboard Hot 100, becoming Drake's first top-ten single. It remained his highest charting single as a lead artist (as both Rihanna collaborations "What's My Name?" and "Work" reached No. 1) in the United States until "One Dance" (2016) peaked at number one.

The song was nominated for two Grammy Awards: Best Rap Solo Performance and Best Rap Song. In early 2010 it was also nominated for Single of the Year at the 2010 Juno Awards, but lost to Michael Bublé's "Haven't Met You Yet".

Artwork
The artwork originally showed  the single as a file on a computer with a plain white background, designed by artwork designer Darkie; this was deemed as too obscure by iTunes. A new cover was created by Darkie.

Controversy
Kia Shine credited himself with the production of the hit single, claiming he co-wrote the song for Drake, entitling him with part ownership of the song. Shine had produced a mixtape track for Lil Wayne titled "Do It for the Boy" which "Best I Ever Had" interpolates. Shine had already received awards from Broadcast Music Incorporated for "Best I Ever Had". Drake maintained that he had never met Shine and admitted that he sampled the Lil Wayne song, but called the claim to the credit "distasteful".

In a lawsuit filed on June 24, 2010, Drake was sued for copyright infringement by Playboy Enterprises over allegations that "Best I Ever Had" samples American rock group Hamilton, Joe Frank & Reynolds' 1975 hit "Fallin' in Love", a song to which Playboy owns the copyright. The suit named Drake, as well as Cash Money Records and Universal Music Group, and asserted that Playboy "has suffered, and will continue to suffer irreparable injury" from the alleged infringement. The lawsuit demanded that "all infringing works be recalled and destroyed". As part of its claim, Playboy also alleged that "each defendant either knew, or should have reasonably known, that the sound recording was protected by copyright".

Music video
Drake told MTV News before his show at Manhattan's SOB's that he was in the process of  putting together a music video for the song. He explained: "I been working with a  people on some ideas," he explained. "I don't wanna say who yet, because everything isn't confirmed yet. It should be pretty solid in the next few days. The biggest thing about that song is that a lot of women come up to me and say, 'That's my song, because it really makes me feel special.' So I told the directors that were interested that I just want the visuals to coincide with that feeling. I want women to feel special when they watch the visual and say, 'I wish that was me,' or 'I know that feeling.' That's the goal with the video — to be genuine and not sappy. Be sexy and keep it together, but still make women smile."

The video, directed by Kanye West, was shot in Brooklyn, New York at Bishop Ford Central Catholic High School. Trey Songz, Fabolous, Consequence, and the song's producer Boi-1da made cameos in the video, as well as artists signed to Young Money Entertainment, such as Lil Twist, Shanell, and Lil Chuckee.

A clip of the video was shown June 30, 2009, on It's On with Alexa Chung, and the full version of the video premiered on the internet on July 1, 2009. The full version of the video made its television debut on AMTV on July 2, 2009. There was criticism of the video in the media, including an article in the British newspaper The Guardian, highlighting the gratuitous focus on the unsupported implanted breasts and prominent posteriors of the female basketball players that Drake coaches in the video.

Synopsis
A women's basketball team prepares for a game, primarily by stretching. Their coach, Drake, references a clipboard of basketball diagrams in the stairwell.  Coach Drake hands out jerseys in his office. In a locker room, he gives an encouraging speech to the team before a championship game. He assures the members of the team that they are all the best. Their opponents, in green jerseys, come out onto the court and are revealed to be much taller and fitter than Drake's team. They are much more successful at scoring points than Drake's team. Drake complains to the referee, who rolls his eyes. Drake calls a timeout and delivers a rousing pep talk, replete with sexual innuendo, to his team. They protest that all he taught them how to do was stretch.

The game resumes and the opposing team continues to prevail, winning with a score of 91 to 14. Drake's team is increasingly distraught. In the closing shots, Drake sits in his office alone, dejected.

Remix
The official remix of the song features American rapper and singer Nicki Minaj. The remix is included on Minaj's mixtape Beam Me Up Scotty. Other artists to add an additional verse after Drake's first hook include Tank, Mase, Busta Rhymes and Swizz Beatz. there is one of R Kelly, and Wiz Khalifa and Rick Ross,Ace Hood,Trey Songz

Chart performance
The song debuted at number 92 on the Billboard Hot 100 in the US and went on to peak at number two for four weeks behind The Black Eyed Peas' "I Gotta Feeling" before falling to number three, making Drake the third Canadian rapper to have a song chart on the Hot 100 (the first being Kardinal Offishall with "Dangerous" at number five, followed by K'naan with "Wavin' Flag" at number 99). The single rose to number one on the Hot R&B/Hip-Hop Songs due to high airplay and downloads. It debuted on Hot Rap Tracks on May 9 at number 24 and peaked at number one. Drake became the first Canadian rapper to achieve a number-one song on the Hot R&B/Hip-Hop Songs and Hot Rap Tracks charts, simultaneously. He is the second Canadian artist to reach the summit of the Hot R&B/Hip-Hop Songs after Deborah Cox's "Nobody's Supposed to Be Here". Within the first two weeks of its availability for sale on iTunes, "Best I Ever Had" garnered over 300,000 units sold. According to the June 29 edition of The New York Times, these sales earned Drake the number four best selling single, behind only songs from The Black Eyed Peas and Sean Kingston. The single peaked at number 49 on the Pop 100 chart before the chart was discontinued. By December 2010, "Best I Ever Had" had been downloaded over 2,000,000 times since its release.

On May 28, 2009, an unauthorized album The Girls Love Drake, released by a label named Canadian Money Entertainment was released to iTunes, which featured the song as well as the Young Money Entertainment song "Every Girl". Both songs jumped on the Billboard Hot 100 due to heavy downloads of the album, at the positions of number 18 and number 35 respectively. After a couple of days it was removed at the request of Drake's management, with Drake filing a lawsuit against the label.

Charts

Weekly charts

Year-end charts

Certifications

See also
List of R&B number-one singles of 2009 (U.S.)

References

External links

Best I Ever Had song lyrics

2009 songs
2009 singles
Drake (musician) songs
Songs written by Drake (musician)
Young Money Entertainment singles
Cash Money Records singles
Song recordings produced by Boi-1da
Music videos directed by Kanye West
Songs written by Lil Wayne
Songs written by Boi-1da
Universal Motown Records singles
Best I Ever Had Remix (Drake Song)